Tiffany  is an English form of the Greek Theophania. It was formerly often given to children born on the feast of Theophania, that is, Epiphany. The equivalent Greek male name is Theophanes, commonly shortened to Phanis and the female is Theophania or Theophano, colloquially Phani.

The name was popular in the US during the 1970s to early 1990s—particularly between 1980 and 1991 the number of babies named Tiffany born each year exceeded 10,000, peaking at 18,361 in 1988. This popularity was spawned by the 1961 movie starring Audrey Hepburn, Breakfast at Tiffany's (which referred to the jewelry company rather than the feast of Epiphany).

People
Notable people with this name include:
Tiffany (American wrestler) (born 1985), better known by her birth name Taryn Terrell
Tiffany (Mexican wrestler) (born 1973), Mexican professional wrestler
Tiffany Alvord (born 1992), American singer-songwriter and actress
Tiffany Bias (born 1992), Thai basketball player
Tiffany Brar, Indian, Founder of Jyothirgamaya Foundation, Social Activist
Tiffany Bolling (born 1947), American actress and singer
Tiffany Brissette (born 1974), American actress
Tiffany Cabán (born 1987), American lawyer and politician
Tiffany Chan (born 1993), Hong Kong golfer
Tiffany Cherry (born 1971), Australian sports broadcaster
Tiffany Chin (born 1967), American figure skater
Tifanie Christun (born 1972), American voice actress
Tiffany Cole (born 1981), American convicted of kidnapping and first degree murder
Tiffany Coyne (born 1982), American model and dancer
Tiffany Darwish (born 1971), American singer, songwriter, and actress known by her mononym "Tiffany"
Tiffany Dupont  (born 1981), American actress
Tiffany Espensen (born 1999), Chinese-born American television and film actress
Tiffany Evans (born 1992), American singer and actress
Tiffany Fallon (born 1974), American model
Tiffany Granath, American actress and radio personality
Tiffany Haddish (born 1979), American comedian and actress.
Tiffany Helm (born 1964), American actress
Tiffany Hsiung, Canadian documentary filmmaker
Tiffany Jackson (basketball) (1985–2022), American basketbal player and coach
Tiffany Limos (born 1980), American actress
Tiff Macklem (born 1961), Canadian economist and central banker
Tiffany Million (born 1966), stage name of former female professional wrestler Sandra Margot Escott
Tiffany Montgomery (born 1982), birth name of Ryan Starr, American singer and actress
Tiffany Moore, American 12-year-old girl who was murdered in 1988
Tiffany Mynx, American pornographic actress and film director
Tiffany Pollard (born 1982), American reality television personality 
Tiffany Poon, (born 1996), Classical pianist
Tiffany Roberts-Lovell, American politician
Tiffany Scott, American figure skater
Tiffany Selby, American model
Tiffany Sessions (born 1968), American woman who has been missing since 1989
Tiff Stevenson (born 1978), British comedian and actress
Tiffany Taylor, American nude model
Tiffani Thiessen (born 1974), American actress
Tiffany Trump (born 1993), daughter of Donald Trump and Marla Maples
Tiffany Thornton, American actress and singer
Tiffany van Soest (born 1989), American kickboxer
Tiffany Villarreal, American singer 
Tiffany Vise (born 1986), American figure skater
Tiffany Whitton (born 1987), American woman who has been missing since 2013
Tiffany Young (stage name) (born Stephanie Hwang), Korean-American singer, a member of Girls' Generation
Tiffany Zahorski (born 1994), English-Russian ice dancer

Fictional characters
 Tiffany, a character in the 1989 American action comedy movie Speed Zone
 Tiffany Aching, a character from the Discworld series by Terry Pratchett
 Tiffany Blum-Deckler, a character from the animated sitcom Daria
 Tiffany Case, a character from the James Bond novel and movie Diamonds Are Forever
 Tiffany (comics), a character in the comic book Spawn
 Tiffany "Pennsatucky" Doggett, a character from the Netflix series Orange Is the New Black
 Tiffany Lords, a character from the Rival Schools video game series
 Tiffany Malloy, a character from the sitcom Unhappily Ever After
 Tiffany Maxwell, the main character of the film Silver Linings Playbook
 Tiffany Maye, a university student and a dateable character in the dating simulation videogame Huniepop
 Tiffany Mitchell, a character on the BBC soap opera EastEnders. Another character, Tiffany Dean, was named after her
 Tiff (short for Tiffany), daughter of Sir Ebrum and Lady Like, citizen of Cappy Town and Kirby's best friend in Kirby: Right Back at Ya!
 Tiffany Valentine, one of the antagonists in Bride of Chucky as well as Seed of Chucky
 Tiffany Welles, a character on Charlie's Angels portrayed by Shelley Hack
 Tiffany, a rabbit villager in the video game series Animal Crossing
 Tiff (short for Tiffany), a fictional character in the American animated series My Life as a Teenage Robot
 Tiffany, a character who plays a suburban mother-of-three with a penchant for motorcycles in the 2021 American science fiction action film The Matrix Resurrections

See also
Tiffany (surname)
Tiffanie (given name), an alternate spelling of Tiffany
Tiphanie
Tiphaine (disambiguation)
Theophano (disambiguation)
Theophania (disambiguation)

References

English feminine given names
Theophoric names